The Benjamin G. Dy Sports Complex, also known as Cauayan City Sports Complex, is a complex of sport facilities located at the city of Cauayan, Isabela.

History
The 300-hectare complex was located at Brgy. Cabaruan, but later moved its location to Brgy. Tagaran. Mayor of Cauayan Bernard Dy said that the government will secure a loan from Land Bank of the Philippines. The  will be for construction of Sports Complex, while  for road infrastructures and lighting facilities. It was initially named Cauayan City Sports Complex by 2016, then later named Benjamin G. Dy Sports Complex in honor of the late Governor of Isabela, Benjamin Dy. It is the largest infrastructure in the Philippines, in which highlights the sustainable development goals by United Nations, and reflects the strong support of city government in realizing the objectives of these global goals.

Facilities

Other facilities
2 Tennis courts
2 Basketball courts (Including 1 3x3)

See also
Cauayan
Isabela Sports Complex
Ilagan Sports Complex
List of football stadiums in the Philippines
List of long course swimming pools in the Philippines

References

Sports complexes in the Philippines
Football venues in the Philippines
Buildings and structures in Isabela (province)